Anise, also called aniseed or rarely anix is a flowering plant in the family Apiaceae native to the eastern Mediterranean region and Southwest Asia.

The flavor and aroma of its seeds have similarities with some other spices and herbs, such as star anise, fennel, licorice, and tarragon. It is widely cultivated and used to flavor food, candy, and alcoholic drinks, especially around the Mediterranean.

Etymology 
The name "anise" is derived via Old French from the Latin words anisum or anethum from Greek  ánēthon referring to dill.

An obsolete English word for anise is anet, also coming from anīsum.

Botany 

Both leaves and flowers are produced in large, loose clusters.

Ecology 
Anise is a food plant for the larvae of some Lepidoptera species (butterflies and moths), including the lime-speck pug and wormwood pug.

Cultivation 
Anise was first cultivated in Egypt and the Middle East, and was brought to Europe for its medicinal value. It has been cultivated in Egypt for approximately 4,000 years.

Anise plants grow best in light, fertile, well-drained soil. The seeds should be planted as soon as the ground warms up in spring. Because the plants have a taproot, they do not transplant well after being established so they should either be started in their final location or be transplanted while the seedlings are still small.

Production 
Western cuisines have long used anise to flavor dishes, drinks, and candies. The word is used for both the species of herb and its licorice-like flavor. The most powerful flavor component of the essential oil of anise, anethole, is found in both anise and an unrelated spice indigenous to northern China called star anise (Illicium verum) widely used in South Asian, Southeast Asian and East Asian dishes. Star anise is considerably less expensive to produce and has gradually displaced P. anisum in Western markets. While formerly produced in larger quantities, by 1999 world production of the essential oil of anise was only 8 tons, compared to 400 tons of star anise.

Uses

Composition 
As with all spices, the composition of anise varies considerably with origin and cultivation method. These are typical values for the main constituents.

Moisture: 9–13%
Protein: 18%
Fatty oil: 8–23%
Essential oil: 2–7%
Starch: 5%
N-free extract: 22–28%
Crude fibre: 12–25%

In particular, the anise seeds products should also contain more than 0.2 milliliter volatile oil per 100 grams of spice.

Culinary 

Anise is sweet and aromatic, distinguished by its characteristic flavor. The seeds, whole or ground, are used for preparation of teas and tisanes (alone or in combination with other aromatic herbs), as well many regional and ethnic confectioneries, including black jelly beans (often marketed as licorice-flavored), British aniseed balls, aniseed twists and "troach" drops, Australian humbugs, New Zealand aniseed wheels, Italian pizzelle and biscotti, German Pfeffernüsse and Springerle, Austrian Anisbögen, Dutch muisjes, New Mexican bizcochitos and Peruvian picarones.

The culinary uses of anise are not limited only to sweets and confections, as it is a key ingredient in Mexican atole de anís and champurrado, which is similar to hot chocolate. In India and Pakistan, it is taken as a digestive after meals, used in brines in the Italian region of Apulia and as a flavoring agent in Italian sausage, pepperoni and other Italian processed meat products. The freshly chopped leaves are added to cheese spreads, dips or salads, while roots and stems impart a mild licorice flavor to soups and stews.

The ancient Romans often served spiced cakes with aniseed called  at the end of feasts as a digestive.  This tradition of serving cake at the end of festivities is the basis for the tradition of serving cake at weddings.

Liquor 

Anise is used to flavor Greek ouzo and mastika; Italian sambuca; French absinthe, anisette, and pastis; Spanish anis de chinchón, anís , anísado and Herbs de Majorca; Turkish and Armenian rakı; Lebanese, Egyptian, Syrian, Jordanian, Palestinian and Israeli arak; and Algerian Anisette Cristal. Outside the Mediterranean region, it is found in Colombian aguardiente and Mexican Xtabentún. These liquors are clear, but on addition of water become cloudy, a phenomenon known as the ouzo effect.

Anise is used together with other herbs and spices in some root beers, such as Virgil's in the United States.

Traditional medicine 
The main use of anise in traditional European herbal medicine was for its carminative effect (reducing flatulence), as noted by John Gerard in his Great Herball, an early encyclopedia of herbal medicine:
The seed wasteth and consumeth winde, and is good against belchings and upbraidings of the stomach, alaieth gripings of the belly, provoketh urine gently, maketh abundance of milke, and stirreth up bodily lust: it staieth the laske (diarrhea), and also the white flux (leukorrhea) in women.

According to Pliny the Elder, anise was used as a cure for sleeplessness, chewed with alexanders and a little honey in the morning to freshen the breath, and, when mixed with wine, as a remedy for asp bites (N.H. 20.72). In Turkish folk medicine, its seeds have been used as an appetite stimulant, tranquilizer or diuretic.

Essential oil

Anise essential oil can be obtained from the fruits by either steam distillation or extraction using supercritical carbon dioxide. The yield of essential oil is influenced by the growing conditions and extraction process, with supercritical extraction being more efficient. Regardless of the method of isolation the main component of the oil is anethole (80–90%), with minor components including 4-anisaldehyde, estragole and pseudoisoeugenyl-2-methylbutyrates amongst others. (Alternately found by Orav et al. 2008 to be 2-6% extracted oil by weight of raw seed material, 74-94% being trans-anethole and the remaining fraction estragole (methylchavicol), anisaldehyde and γ-himachalene.) Anethole is responsible for anise's characteristic odor and flavor.

Other uses 
Builders of steam locomotives in Britain incorporated capsules of aniseed oil into white metal plain bearings so the distinctive smell would give warning in case of overheating. Anise can be made into a liquid scent and is used for both drag hunting and fishing. It is put on fishing lures to attract fish.

Culture 
Anise is the main ingredient used by Bilbo Baggins in J. R. R. Tolkien's The Hobbit (1935) for his seed cakes served before the dwarves and Gandalf in the beginning of the novel's main story in his household from the Shire.

References

Further reading 
 
 

 
Edible Apiaceae
Flora of Malta
Indian spices
Medicinal plants of Africa
Medicinal plants of Asia
Medicinal plants of Europe
Pimpinella
Spices